Michal Mackevič; born 1 October 1953 in Vilnius) is a Lithuanian Polish journalist, politician, president of the Association of Poles in Lithuania, and member of the Lithuanian Seimas (2008, 2012, 2016). He was also the founder and editor-in-chief of Magazyn Wileński.

In October 2010, he was awarded Officer's Cross of the Order of Merit of the Republic of Poland for the outstanding merits before Polish diaspora for the promotion of Poland and Polish traditions and culture.

References

External links
 Profile at the Seimas of the Republic of Lithuania official website

Polish politicians
Lithuanian people of Polish descent
Living people
Journalists from Vilnius
1953 births
Members of the Seimas
21st-century Lithuanian politicians
Officers of the Order of Merit of the Republic of Poland
Politicians from Vilnius